Jocelyn Viterna is an American academic. She is a professor of Sociology at Harvard University, and the author of a book about the role of women in the Salvadoran Civil War.

Early life
Jocelyn Viterna grew up in Curtis, Nebraska and Manhattan, Kansas. She earned a bachelor's degree from Kansas State University in 1995 and a PhD from Indiana University Bloomington in Sociology and Latin American Studies in 2003.

Career

Viterna was an assistant professor of Sociology and Latin American Studies at Tulane University from 2003 to 2006. She joined Harvard University in 2003, where she became professor of Sociology and director of undergraduate studies in Sociology.

Her first book, Women in War: The Micro-level Processes of Mobilization in El Salvador, is about the role that women played in the Salvadoran Civil War of 1979-1992. It is based on interviews with woman who joined the Farabundo Martí National Liberation Front. Viterna shows that women were initially recruited from the Catholic Church and the peasantry, but later joined the FMNLF to avoid rape. She also shows that women who "became organizers in the refugee camps" or "guerrilla leaders" fared better. In a review for the European Review of Latin American and Caribbean Studies, Ralph Sprenkels of Utrecht University suggests Viterna should have delved into the tension between "the well-positioned urban minority and the peasant majority inside the FMNLF and its implications for gender roles." However, Sprenkels concludes that the book is "a remarkable feat" and "essential reading for anyone interested in El Salvador's civil war, as well as for students of gender, political and social movements." Reviewing it for Social Forces, David Smilde highlights confusing statements about the occurrence of rape in refugee camps. He also notes that Viterna could have spent more time analyzing the status of "non-combatants."

Personal life
With Jason Beckfield, who is the chair of the Sociology department at Harvard University, she has two children.

Works

References

20th-century births
Living people
People from Frontier County, Nebraska
Kansas State University alumni
Indiana University Bloomington alumni
Tulane University faculty
Harvard University faculty
American sociologists
American women sociologists
American women academics
Year of birth missing (living people)
21st-century American women